Nikolai Ivanovich Ashmarin (Yadrin, Kazan Governorate – August 26, 1933, Kazan) was a Russian scholar who specialized in the study of Chuvash language, culture, and history. His magnum opus is "The Dictionary of Chuvash Language", published in 17 parts between 1928 and 1958.

After graduating from the Lazarev Institute in 1896, Ashmarin taught at the schools and universities of Kazan (with short spells in Simbirsk and Baku). He published a valuable collection of Chuvash songs in 1900. He was elected a corresponding member of the Academy of Sciences of the USSR in 1929.

External links
 Ashmarin's book "Bulgars and Chuvashes" (in Russian)

1870 births
1933 deaths
People from Yadrinsky District
People from Yadrinsky Uyezd
Linguists of Turkic languages
Linguists from Russia
Russian Turkologists
Corresponding Members of the USSR Academy of Sciences
Chuvash language